Goli Daraq, also rendered as Gol Daraq or Goli Darreh, may refer to:
 Goli Daraq-e Olya
 Goli Daraq-e Sofla